PowerHawk or Power Hawk may refer to:

Six Chuter Power Hawk, an American powered parachute design
Sky Science PowerHawk, a British powered parachute design
Studebaker Power Hawk, an American automobile design